Fairfield Athletic or Fairfield Football Club was an Association football team from Fairfield, now a suburb of Droylsden, Greater Manchester.

Fairfield were formed in the 1880s, entering the Lancashire League in 1892. Two 9th out of 12 positions followed.

Their first successful season was 1894–95, where the championship was won ahead of Blackpool. The season provided their greatest progression in the FA Cup, eventually losing to Sunderland 11–1. At the end of the season the club made its first attempt at entry to the Football League, losing out to Loughborough who replaced Walsall Town Swifts.

The following season another failed attempt was made with only 3 votes received. This was more than Tottenham Hotspur.

The 1896–97 season resulted in a runners up spot and the last attempt to gain entry to the Football League. The club failed again but did gain more votes than Crewe Alexandra and Millwall Athletic.

Fairfield were listed for the 1897 season but either folded during the summer or early after the start.

Sources

External links
Football Club History Database – Fairfield

Defunct football clubs in England
Association football clubs disestablished in 1897
1897 disestablishments in England
Football clubs in Tameside
Lancashire League (football)
Droylsden
Defunct football clubs in Greater Manchester
Association football clubs established in the 19th century